Below is a list of current championship (or "meet") records for the two World Championships in swimming: 
the swimming events of the FINA World Aquatics Championships, held in a long course (50 meter) pool.
FINA World Swimming Championships (25 m), at which swimming is the only discipline. This meet is held in a short course (25 meter) pool.

Both events are organized by the international governing body for aquatics, FINA. These are the fastest times ever swum at any edition of the meet.

Long course (50 m)

Men

Women

Mixed relay

Short course (25 m)

Men

Women

Mixed relay

References
General
FINA: Long Course World Championships Records – Men 25 June 2022
FINA: Long Course World Championships Records – Women 22 June 2022
FINA: Long Course World Championships Records – Mixed 24 June 2022
FINA: Short Course World Championships Records – Men 18 December 2022
FINA: Short Course World Championships Records – Women 18 December 2022
FINA: Short Course World Championships Records – Mixed 16 December 2022
Specific

External links
 Swim Rankings record list (including full history)

World championships
Swimming at the World Aquatics Championships